Rafael Romero Serrano (born 22 February 1986), known as Fali, is a Spanish retired footballer who played as a right back.

Club career

Córdoba
Born in Córdoba, Andalusia, Fali began his career at local Córdoba CF, starting out as a senior with the reserves. He made his professional debut with the first team on 27 March 2005, as a substitute in a goalless home draw against Sporting de Gijón in the Segunda División; it was his sole appearance of the season, which ended with relegation.

Fali appeared in ten more matches for the main squad, all in the following campaign's Segunda División B.

Barcelona
Fali joined FC Barcelona in 2006, playing initially in their C and B sides. On 11 May 2008 he was included in the first team's matchday squad for the first time, remaining unused in a 3–2 defeat to RCD Mallorca at the Camp Nou. He made his only appearance for the Blaugrana six days later, coming on as a substitute for Lilian Thuram for the final 19 minutes of a 5–3 win at Real Murcia which concluded the season.

Later years
In the summer of 2008, Fali signed with third-tier club Terrassa FC. The following year, he moved to Écija Balompié of the same league.

Fali scored the only goal of his career on 28 February 2010, the 94th-minute sole strike in an away victory over Moratalla CF.

References

External links

1986 births
Living people
Footballers from Córdoba, Spain
Spanish footballers
Association football defenders
La Liga players
Segunda División players
Segunda División B players
Tercera División players
Córdoba CF B players
Córdoba CF players
FC Barcelona C players
FC Barcelona Atlètic players
FC Barcelona players
Terrassa FC footballers
Écija Balompié players